Hans Stig Trappaud Rønne (30 December 1887 – 15 September 1951) was a Danish gymnast who competed in the 1920 Summer Olympics. He was part of the Danish team, which was able to win the gold medal in the gymnastics men's team, free system event in 1920.

References

1887 births
1951 deaths
Danish male artistic gymnasts
Gymnasts at the 1920 Summer Olympics
Olympic gymnasts of Denmark
Olympic gold medalists for Denmark
Olympic medalists in gymnastics
People from Albertslund Municipality
Medalists at the 1920 Summer Olympics
Sportspeople from the Capital Region of Denmark